Modbury Hospital is a hospital that provides inpatient, outpatient and emergency services to a population of over 400,000 people living primarily in Adelaide's north-eastern suburbs. Opened in 1973, Modbury Hospital is the major 24-hour and same-day elective surgery and rehabilitation hub for the north and north-eastern area. The hospital was renovated in the 2010s.

References

External links 

Modbury Hospital Foundation Website

Hospital buildings completed in 1973
Hospital buildings completed in 1980
Hospitals in Adelaide
Hospitals established in 1973
1973 establishments in Australia